Asen Dangov Chalakov (born 17 May 1983) is a Bulgarian football midfielder.

References

1983 births
Living people
Bulgarian footballers
PFC Rilski Sportist Samokov players
PFC Vidima-Rakovski Sevlievo players
FC Botev Vratsa players
First Professional Football League (Bulgaria) players

Association football midfielders